Manzin is a surname. Notable people with the surname include:

 Lorrenzo Manzin (born 1994), French cyclist
 Lucio Manzin (1913–?), Italian equestrian
 Roberto Manzin (born 1966), Italian musician and composer

See also
 Manzini (disambiguation)
 Manzon